The CAF Super Cup (also known as African Super Cup or for sponsorship reasons Orange CAF Super Cup) is an annual African association football competition contested between the winners of the CAF Champions League and the CAF Confederation Cup. The competition was first held in 1993 and is organised by the Confederation of African Football (CAF). It is the continental equivalent of the UEFA Super Cup in European and Recopa Sudamericana in South American club football. 

The competition was previously contested between the winners of the CAF Champions League (called African Cup of Champions Clubs from 1964 to 1996) and African Cup Winners' Cup until 2004 when the Cup Winners' Cup was discontinued. The last Super Cup in this format was the 2004 CAF Super Cup between Enyimba and Étoile du Sahel which Enyimba won 1–0. In 2004 the CAF Cup Winners' Cup was merged with CAF Cup into the newly established CAF Confederation Cup which acts as Africa's second-tier international club competition, (analogous to the UEFA Europa League in European football) and since 2005 the competition is contested in its current format. 

Egyptian side Al Ahly hold the record for the most victories, winning the competition Eight times since its inception. They are also one of only two teams to have retained the Super Cup title, doing so in 2007, after winning the previous competition in 2006 (the other being Nigerian side Enyimba who won the Super Cup in 2004 and 2005) and again in 2014. Teams from Egypt have won the competition the most, with teams from the country winning the competition Twelve times. Al Ahly is the most successful team with Eight titles.

Finals

From 1993 to 2010, in case of a tie, extra time would be played. If still tied, the match would go to a penalty shootout.
Starting from 2011, in case of a tie, no extra time will be played, and the match will go straight to a penalty shootout.

Performances

Results by club

Results by country

By method of qualification

(*): Known as African Cup of Champions Clubs from 1964 to 1996
(**): Merged with CAF Cup in 2004 to form CAF Confederation Cup.

Notes
 A.  The Confederation of African Football and RSSSF classify Super Cup editions as belonging to the football season in which the qualified teams won their respective tournaments, even though the Super Cup match is always played in February or March the following year. On the other hand, FIFA lists them according to the calendar year in which the match was played. This article uses the latter format.
B.   In 1995 DC Motema Pembe, based in Kinshasa, represented Zaire, which was the name used between 1971 and 1997 for today's Democratic Republic of the Congo.
C.  In 2001 the Super Cup was originally planned to be held in Accra, Ghana, but Zamalek sought a change of venue to Cairo, citing safety concerns following the incidents at the 2000 CAF Champions League final when the match was interrupted for 18 minutes after teargas had been fired into the rioting crowd. CAF eventually imposed a year-long ban on international club football at Hearts of Oak's stadium and decided to move the Super Cup venue to Kumasi.

References
General

Specific

External links
 CAF Super Cup official website

CAF Super Cup
CAF Super Cup